Pseudosterrha is a genus of moths in the family Geometridae described by Warren in 1888.

African species
Pseudosterrha colettae (Hausmann, 2006)
Pseudosterrha paulula (Swinhoe, 1886)
Pseudosterrha rufistrigata (Hampson, 1896)

References

Cosymbiini